c Capricorni can refer to two different stars:

 c1 Capricorni or 46 Capricorni, commonly called simply c Capricorni.
 c2 Capricorni or 47 Capricorni.

References

Capricornus (constellation)
Capricorni, c